Cultural Amnesia is a book of biographical essays by Clive James, first published in 2007. The British title, published by MacMillan, is Cultural Amnesia: Notes in the Margin of My Time, while the American title, published by W. W. Norton, is Cultural Amnesia: Necessary Memories From History and the Arts. The cover illustration was adapted from a work by the German Modernist designer Peter Behrens.

Reception 
Reviewing the book for The Atlantic, Christopher Hitchens argued that James tries "to glamorize the uninspiring - tries to show how tough and shapely were the common sense formulations of Raymond Aron for example, when set against the seductive, panoptic bloviations of Jean Paul Sartre" and that he "succeeds in it by trying to comb out all centrist clichés and by caring almost as much about language as it is possible to do." Additionally, Hitchens noted that "a unifying principle of the collection is its feminism" and that "one of James's charms as a critic is that he genuinely seems to enjoy praising people."

Contents
The book is a series of essays on 106 people James has been fascinated by, most of them from the 20th century. The chapters are in alphabetical order of the subject's name, as follows:

Anna Akhmatova
Peter Altenberg
Louis Armstrong
Raymond Aron
Walter Benjamin
Marc Bloch
Jorge Luis Borges
Robert Brasillach
Sir Thomas Browne
Albert Camus
Dick Cavett
Paul Celan
Chamfort
Coco Chanel
Charles Chaplin
Nirad C. Chaudhuri
G. K. Chesterton
Jean Cocteau
Gianfranco Contini
Benedetto Croce
Tony Curtis
Ernst Robert Curtius
Miles Davis
Sergei Diaghilev
Pierre Drieu La Rochelle
Alfred Einstein
Duke Ellington
Federico Fellini
W. C. Fields
F. Scott Fitzgerald
Gustave Flaubert
Sigmund Freud
Egon Friedell
François Furet
Charles de Gaulle
Edward Gibbon
Terry Gilliam
Joseph Goebbels
Witold Gombrowicz
William Hazlitt
Georg Wilhelm Friedrich Hegel
Heinrich Heine
Adolf Hitler
Ricarda Huch
Ernst Jünger
Franz Kafka
John Keats
Leszek Kołakowski
Alexandra Kollontai
Heda Margolius Kovály
Karl Kraus
Georg Christoph Lichtenberg
Norman Mailer
Nadezhda Mandelstam
Golo Mann
Heinrich Mann
Michael Mann
Thomas Mann
Mao Zedong
Chris Marker
John McCloy
Zinka Milanov
Czesław Miłosz
Eugenio Montale
Montesquieu
Alan Moorehead
Paul Muratov
Lewis Namier
Grigory Ordzhonokidze
Octavio Paz
Alfred Polgar
Beatrix Potter
Jean Prévost
Marcel Proust
Edgar Quinet
Marcel Reich-Ranicki
Jean-François Revel
Richard Rhodes
Rainer Maria Rilke
Virginio Rognoni
Ernesto Sabato
Edward Said
Sainte-Beuve
José Saramago
Jean-Paul Sartre
Erik Satie
Arthur Schnitzler
Sophie Scholl
Wolf Jobst Siedler
Manès Sperber
Tacitus
Margaret Thatcher
Henning von Tresckow
Leon Trotsky

Dubravka Ugrešić
Miguel de Unamuno
Pedro Henríquez Ureña
Paul Valéry
Mario Vargas Llosa
Evelyn Waugh
Ludwig Wittgenstein
Isoroku Yamamoto
Aleksandr Zinoviev
Carl Zuckmayer
Stefan Zweig

References

External links
Cultural Amnesia on Clive James' official website

Essay collections
2007 non-fiction books
Macmillan Publishers books